The Premier League Hall of Fame honours the leading association football players that have played in the Premier League, the top level of the English football league system. Inaugurated in 2020 but delayed a year due to the COVID-19 pandemic, the Hall of Fame is intended to recognise and honour players that have achieved great success and made a significant contribution to the league since its founding in 1992.

As part of the inaugural class of 2021, eight players were inducted; Alan Shearer, Thierry Henry, Eric Cantona, Roy Keane, Frank Lampard, Dennis Bergkamp, Steven Gerrard, and David Beckham. The next year, a further eight players were inducted.

Eligibility requirements
For players to be eligible for induction into the Premier League Hall of Fame, several criteria are taken into consideration, primarily players who have an "exceptional record of on-pitch success and have shown significant contribution" since the inception of the Premier League in 1992. Other factors are also taken into consideration, with players needing to have retired before the start of the awarding season, and are only judged on their domestic performances in the Premier League with no other competitions considered. Additionally, players must have made 250 appearances in the league, or achieved one of the following:
 Appeared in more than 200 Premier League appearances for one club
 Selected to any of the Team of the Decade or 20-Year Anniversary teams
 Won a Premier League Golden Boot or Golden Glove
 Been voted as Premier League Player of the Season
 Won three Premier League titles
 Scored 100 Premier League goals, or goalkeepers who have recorded 100 Premier League clean sheets

Upon the initial announcement of the Hall of Fame in 2020, Premier League chief executive Richard Masters said a place in the Hall of Fame is "reserved for the very best", and would allow fans to help celebrate "truly exceptional" careers.

Inductees

Players by nationality

Nominees

2021
The first two inductees were originally to be announced in March 2020, but the announcement was postponed due to the COVID-19 pandemic. Along with 2021 inaugural inductees Thierry Henry and Alan Shearer, a fan vote determined additional inductees; the inaugural nominees were:

Players in bold were inducted for the Premier League Hall of Fame that year

  Tony Adams
  David Beckham
  Dennis Bergkamp
  Sol Campbell
  Eric Cantona
  Andy Cole
  Ashley Cole
  Didier Drogba
  Les Ferdinand
  Rio Ferdinand
  Robbie Fowler
  Steven Gerrard
  Roy Keane
  Frank Lampard
  Matt Le Tissier
  Michael Owen
  Peter Schmeichel
  Paul Scholes
  John Terry
  Robin van Persie
  Nemanja Vidić
  Patrick Vieira
  Ian Wright

2022
Along with 2022 inductees Wayne Rooney and Patrick Vieira, a fan vote took place to determine six additional players to be inducted as part of the 2022 class. The 2022 nominees were:

Players in bold were inducted for the Premier League Hall of Fame that year

  Tony Adams
  Sergio Agüero
  Sol Campbell
  Petr Čech
  Andy Cole
  Ashley Cole
  Didier Drogba
  Patrice Evra
  Les Ferdinand
  Rio Ferdinand
  Robbie Fowler
  Vincent Kompany
  Matt Le Tissier
  Gary Neville
  Michael Owen
  Peter Schmeichel
  Paul Scholes
  Teddy Sheringham
  John Terry
  Yaya Touré
  Edwin van der Sar
  Ruud van Nistelrooy
  Robin van Persie
  Nemanja Vidić
  Ian Wright

References
General
 

Specific

Premier League Hall of Fame inductees
H
Hall
Association football museums and halls of fame
Lists of English sportspeople
Halls of fame in England
2021 establishments in England
2021 in British sport
2021 in association football